Buddhi Tamang (born 2 March 1982) is a Nepalese actor and a theatrical performer. He has appeared in numerous Nepali feature films, some music videos, television commercials and print advertisements.

Career
Buddhi Tamang started his career by joining a theater in Kathmandu and worked there for many years before making it onto the silver screen. He came to the  limelight with the success of the hit film Kabaddi Kabaddi . His dialogue “Hait” started trending and helped him to gain recognition. He mainly works in a supporting role. He also had a role as "Hanumane" in the hit Nepali sitcom Television series  Meri Bassai.

Filmography

Films

References

External links 
 

Living people
21st-century Nepalese male actors
1982 births
Nepalese male film actors
People from Kavrepalanchok District
Nepalese male comedians
Tamang people